Iain Kelso (born June 19, 1975) is a Canadian musician and film score composer.

Education
Kelso studied several musical instruments, and participated in the 2003 ASCAP film scoring workshop under composer Richard Bellis.

Career
Kelso wrote scores for several independent films, beginning in 2003.  He created the score for the 2011 independent film Jacob, directing and recording live musicians. The score received the award for best music at the 45th WorldFest-Houston International Film Festival in 2012.

Filmography
 2003: Love Wine
 2006: Blind Eye
 2008: The Mystical Adventures of Billy Owens
 2009: Billy Owens and the Secret of the Runes
 2011: Jacob

References

External links

 Official Site

1975 births
Canadian film score composers
Living people
Male film score composers
Musicians from Thunder Bay